The 9×25mm Dillon is a pistol wildcat cartridge developed for use in USPSA/IPSC Open guns. The cartridge is made by necking down a 10mm Auto case to 9 mm.

History
Around 1987, Randy Shelley, an employee of Dillon Precision, necked down 10mm Auto brass to 9 mm.  His goal was to get as much slow-burning powder in the case as possible in order to drive a 9 mm bullet to the velocity needed to qualify for the then-IPSC major power factor of 175.  The short-necked and steep-shouldered cartridge holds twice the powder of a .38 Super Auto case.

The 9×25mm Dillon was used by several notable IPSC shooters, such as Rob Leatham and Jack Barnes. 

Most shooters, looking at the 9×25mm Dillon today, focus on the extreme velocities of which it is capable. A 115 grain bullet at 1,800 fps is more than is needed for competition. There, a 115 only needs to be going a bit over 1,500 ft/s to qualify for major power factor. Competitors in the late 1980s and early 1990s who were using the 9×25mm Dillon used the additional powder available over .38 Super to produce more gas in the compensator, or muzzle brake, to make pistols shoot with as little muzzle rise as possible to allow faster follow-up shots on target. A muzzle brake works by diverting gases perpendicularly relative to the barrel to reduce felt recoil. The greater the gas volume, or the pressure that gas is at, the more force the compensator or muzzle brake creates. Competitors could "feed" a compensator more gases than comparable .38 Super loads. However, the muzzle blast also increased significantly, and the resulting recoil re-direction could be excessive with reports of some loads causing compensated pistols to recoil downwards. Rob Leatham developed loads with less powder to mitigate the blast, but discovered there was little advantage over a similar load in .38 Super.

What put an end to the 9×25mm Dillon in competition was lowering of the USPSA major power factor from 175 to 165 (160 for IPSC competition) which improved the safety and effectiveness of .38 Super (and later 9x19 "Major") loads to a point that the extra rounds that would fit maximum-allowed length magazines outweighed any muzzle flip advantage from the 9×25mm Dillon. Once worn out, pistols were often retired or rebuilt in .38 Super.

Cartridge dimensions
The 9×25mm Dillon has 1.48 ml (22.8 grains)  H2O cartridge case capacity.

9×25mm Dillon maximum cartridge dimensions. All sizes in millimeters (mm).

Americans define the shoulder angle at alpha/2 = 30 degrees. The common rifling twist rate for this cartridge is 406 mm (1 in 16 in), 6 grooves, Ø lands = 8.79 mm, Ø grooves = 9.02 mm, land width = 3.07 mm and the primer type is large pistol.

According to the QuickLOAD database the 9x25mm Dillon case can handle up to 250 MPa (36,259 psi) piezo pressure. Since there are no C.I.P. or SAAMI limits and data sets for wildcat cartridges this data is unproven.

The Austrian 9×25mm Super Auto G pistol cartridge is probably the closest ballistic twin of the 9×25mm Dillon. These cartridges are both necked down 9 mm variants of the 10mm Auto cartridge though they dimensionally vary.

Reloading
Making the 9×25mm Dillon is fairly easy. Dillon Precision makes the necessary resizing die and reliable reloading data is easily found. Most people use 115 to 125 grain bullets, but bullets with weights as low as 80 grains are used, too.

Commercial availability
Loaded cartridges: As of 2016, DoubleTap offers six 9×25mm Dillon factory ammunition loads from 80 to 180 grains.
Underwood Ammo offers three 9×25mm Dillon factory ammunition loads from 90 to 125 grains.

Conversions: Drop-in barrels are available as aftermarket parts for the Glock 40, Glock 20 and Glock 29 semi-automatic pistols. These pistols are originally chambered by Glock for parent cartridge of the 9×25mm Dillon, the 10mm Auto.

See also
.357 SIG
List of firearms
List of handgun cartridges
Power factor (pistol)

References

9x25 home page, October 7, 2001 archive accessed
 9x25mm Dillon - 2nd Edition Lyman Pistol and Revolver Handbook, Page 91

External links
Underwood:  9x25mm Dillon
Dillon Precision
USPSA
IPSC
Cartridge drawing
Loading data

Pistol and rifle cartridges
Wildcat cartridges